Ibrahim Galadari is a dermatologist and currently a professor in United Arab Emirates University and head of Galadari Derma Clinic, a private dermatology practice in Dubai. Galadari is also one of the founder members in the Faculty of Medicine and Human Science at the United Arab Emirates University situated in Al Ain.

Education
Galadari obtained his medical degree from Cairo University, M.B.B.Ch. Egypt in 1979. He then pursued his specializations in dermatology and venereology. He graduated with a master's degree, MSc, from Cairo University, Egypt in 1983. Then traveled to the United States of America to be part of a Fellowship in Dermatopathology at Wayne State University in 1987. During the time when he was in Wayne State University he completed his Doctorate degree, MD in  1988.

Clinical career
Galadari spent his internship and residency years in Cairo University Hospitals from 1979 to 1983. He then became a specialist dermatologist at Rashid Hospital (Dubai Health Authority). He then moved to the United Arab Emirates University based in Al Ain as they were establishing their Faculty of Medicine and Health Sciences in 1986. He currently is a professor and consultant dermatologist practicing in United Arab Emirates University hospitals.

Academic career
Galadari joined the United Arab Emirates University as a teaching assistant in 1980. He was promoted in 1989 to an assistant professor in dermatology, then an associate professor in 1998 and a professor in 2007. Galadari is also the author of the Handbook of Dermatology and Venereology.

Administrative career

In 1990, he was appointed Assistant Dean of Student Affairs at the Faculty of Medicine and Health Sciences of United Arab Emirates University.

Books
Galadari published studies in refereed medical journals and is an editorial board member of SkinMed Journal.

Histopathology of the Skin, by Lever & Lever. Contributed in the chapter of tumors, 1990
Editors of Diabetes Mellitus and its complications, 1993
Skin and Hair (Arabic edition), 1989, 1992, 1994 (4 editions)
Handbook on Dermatology and Venereology, UAE University Press1994 (first edition), 1997 (second edition), 2000 (third edition).
Skin and cosmetic. Arabic book, 2008

References

Living people
Emirati dermatologists
Academic staff of United Arab Emirates University
1956 births